Patoka Township is one of nine townships in Crawford County, Indiana, United States. As of the 2010 census, its population was 1,579 and it contained 1,076 housing units.

Geography

Unincorporated towns
 Newton Stewart
 Riceville
 Taswell
 Wickliffe
(This list is based on USGS data and may include former settlements.)

Adjacent townships
 Jackson Township, Orange County (north)
 Greenfield Township, Orange County (northeast)
 Sterling Township (east)
 Union Township (southeast)
 Jefferson Township, Dubois County (southwest)
 Johnson Township (southwest)
 Hall Township, Dubois County (west)

Major highways
  Indiana State Road 64
  Indiana State Road 145
  Indiana State Road 164

Cemeteries
The township contains four cemeteries: Brown, Eckerty, Mount Eden and Williams.

References
 United States Census Bureau cartographic boundary files
 U.S. Board on Geographic Names

External links

 Indiana Township Association
 United Township Association of Indiana

Townships in Crawford County, Indiana
Townships in Indiana